The 1991 Penn State Nittany Lions football team represented the Pennsylvania State University in the 1991 NCAA Division I-A football season. The team was coached by Joe Paterno and played its home games in Beaver Stadium in University Park, Pennsylvania.

Schedule

Roster

Rankings

Season summary

vs. Georgia Tech

at USC

BYU

Gerry Collins 27 Rush, 99 Yds
Penn State's defense sacked Ty Detmer six times and held BYU to single digits for first time since 1986

at Miami (FL)

    
    
    
    
    
    
    
    
    

Fans watching on television outside of Florida missed two scores when the network switched to United States Supreme Court nominee Clarence Thomas testifying before the Senate Judiciary Committee

Notre Dame

vs. Tennessee (Fiesta Bowl)

NFL Draft
Nine Nittany Lions were drafted in the 1992 NFL Draft.

References

Penn State
Penn State Nittany Lions football seasons
Lambert-Meadowlands Trophy seasons
Fiesta Bowl champion seasons
Penn State Nittany Lions football